Ragtime is a style of music.

Ragtime may also refer to:

Arts and entertainment
 Ragtime (novel) (1975), by E. L. Doctorow
 Ragtime (film) (1981),  based on the novel
 Ragtime (musical) (1998), based on the novel
 Ragtime (1927 film), an American silent film directed by Scott Pembroke 
 Ragtime (TV series) (1973–1975), a BBC television series for children
 "Ragtime", a song by Brand Nubian from their 1990 album One for All
 Ragtime for Eleven Instruments (1917–18), chamber music, and Ragtime (1921) for piano solo, compositions by Igor Stravinsky
 Ragtime (I) (1960), second ballet by George Balanchine to Stravinsky's Ragtime for Eleven Instruments
 Ragtime (II) (1966), third ballet by George Balanchine to Stravinsky's Ragtime for Eleven Instruments

Other uses
 Ragtime (code name), four secret surveillance programs of the NSA
 RagTime, business publishing software